Torsten is a series of projects by pop singer Andy Bell of the band Erasure consisting of various stage acts performed by him, and accompanying soundtracks, concept albums and remix albums. The series was written by playwright Barney Ashton-Bullock, and music by Christopher Frost. Two major works emerged, Torsten the Bareback Saint (2014) and Torsten the Beautiful Libertine (2016) with two accompanying album / soundtracks and two Variance Remix albums.

Torsten the Bareback Saint

Torsten the Bareback Saint is a one-person show and concept album written by playwright Barney Ashton-Bullock, and performed by pop singer Andy Bell. The score is composed, orchestrated and arranged by Christopher Frost and produced by Mike Allison. The artistic director was Predrag Pajdic.

Promotional material for the show describes it as "a set of musical postcards from the hotspots of memory of a semi-immortal polysexual". The music is an episodic song-cycle, which Bell performs accompanied by a small musical ensemble.

Bell debuted the show at the 2014 Edinburgh Festival Fringe, where he performed at Assembly Studio One daily from the 5th through the 16th of August. Prior to the festival, he gave two private performances at the St. James Theatre in London. The first of these, on 24 July 2014, was for an invited audience of family and friends; the second, on 26 July, he performed for a small gathering of fans.

Soundtrack album

A studio-recorded soundtrack album was released on 28 July 2014 by Strike Force Entertainment, an imprint of Cherry Red Records.

Two songs were released as singles. "I Don't Like" released on 7 July 2014 and "Fountain of Youth" released on 11 August 2014.

On the back cover of the retail CD release, the titles of tracks 1, 8, and 10 are censored: "Freshly", "V for…?", and "Mobile".

Variance – 'The Torsten the Bareback Saint' Remixes

Following the release of the soundtrack, a remix album was released in 2015. One single, "Weston-Super-Mare" was released from the remix album in 2015.

Torsten the Beautiful Libertine

Following Torsten the Bareback Saint, Andy launched a musical stage show titled Torsten the Beautiful Libertine at the Above the Stag Theatre in London in March 2016. It is also written by playwright Barney Ashton-Bullock, with music by Christopher Frost.

Soundtrack album
He also released a 17-track album containing songs written by Barney Ashton-Bullock. It was released on Cherry Red Records. From the press release: "On the album Andy assumes the character of Torsten who has had, over time, many lovers and friends whom ultimately he has outlived. That he himself survives is a bittersweet truth, but it is with an increasingly melancholic emotional distance from people.

The album was made available as a download and also in a limited-edition black vinyl and CD format presented in mini-gatefold LP style. It also includes a twenty page booklet of lyrics and new colour photographs.

One song was released as a single "My Precious One" on 4 March 2016

Tracklist

Variance – 'The Torsten the Beautiful Libertine' Remixes

Like the Torsten the Bareback Saint, the release of Torsten the Beautiful Libertine was followed by a Variance Remix titled Variance II. The remix album was released on 1 July 2016. One more single, "Queercore!" was released from the remix album in 2016.

Tracklist

Part One - Senseless Symphony

Part Two - The Remixes

References

External links
 
 
 
 

Plays for one performer
Song cycles
2014 soundtrack albums
Pop soundtracks
Soundtracks by English artists
Theatre soundtracks
Andy Bell (singer) albums
Concept albums